Bannur is a municipality in Mysore district in the state of Karnataka, India.

Geography
It has an average elevation of 654 metres (2145 feet).
T Narasipura Taluk Near Somanathapur Temple pin code 571101

Bannur temple
Bannur temple is located right opposite to the bus station.  The temple car is decorated during festival times and dragged along the town in a procession of musicians and dancers.  Thousands of people takes part in this festival which is conducted in February every year.

Demographics
As of 2011 Census, Bannur Town Municipal Council has population of 21,896 of which 10,849 are males while 11,047 are females as per report released by Census India 2011.

Population of Children with age of 0-6 is 2366 which is 10.81% of total population of Bannur (TMC). In Bannur Town Municipal Council, Female Sex Ratio is of 1018 against state average of 973. Moreover, Child Sex Ratio in Bannur is around 1040 compared to Karnataka state average of 948. Literacy rate of Bannur city is 70.75% lower than state average of 75.36%. In Bannur, Male literacy is around 74.85% while female literacy rate is 66.72%.

Bannur Town Municipal Council has total administration over 5,186 houses to which it supplies basic amenities like water and sewerage. It is also authorize to build roads within Town Municipal Council limits and impose taxes on properties coming under its jurisdiction.

Image Gallery

See also

 Yachenahalli
 Srirangapatna
 Arakere
 Karighatta Road
 Kodagahalli
 Somanathapura
Beedanahalli
 Mahadevapura

References

Cities and towns in Mysore district